Bcl-2-related protein A1 is a protein that in humans is encoded by the BCL2A1 gene.

Function 

This gene encodes a member of the bcl2 protein family. The proteins of this family form hetero- or homodimers and act as anti- and pro-apoptotic regulators that are involved in a wide variety of cellular activities such as embryonic development, homeostasis and tumorigenesis. The protein encoded by this gene is able to reduce the release of pro-apoptotic cytochrome c from mitochondria and block caspase activation. This gene is a direct transcription target of NF-kappa B in response to inflammatory mediators, and has been shown to be up-regulated by different extracellular signals, such as granulocyte-macrophage colony-stimulating factor (GM-CSF), CD40, phorbol ester and inflammatory cytokine TNF and IL-1, which suggests a cytoprotective function that is essential for lymphocyte activation as well as cell survival.

In melanocytic cells BCL2A1 gene expression may be regulated by MITF.

Interactions
BCL2-related protein A1 has been shown to interact with:
 Bcl-2-associated X protein, and
 Bcl-2-associated death promoter.

References

External links

Further reading